Cecilia Beatriz Galliano (born 5 March 1976) is an Argentine actress, model and television presenter who has developed most of her career in Mexico.

Biography
Galliano was born on 5 March 1978 in Marcos Juárez, Argentina. At the age of 16 she went to Buenos Aires where she worked as a model and waitress in a restaurant in front of the Obelisk. At 19, Galliano went to Mexico where she worked with photographer Enrique Covarrubias and was the model for his campaign that year.

Galliano presented the "Los 10 primeros" list of successes. She played Violeta Ruiz on the telenovela Una familia con suerte.

From October 2010 to June 2016, Galliano was the presenter of Sabadazo alongside Laura G and Omar Chaparro.

Despite having spent more than 20 years living in Mexico and having a Mexican son, she has not requested the Mexican nationality for her, as she feels sorry to have to sing the Mexican national anthem in public.

Filmography

References

External links

1978 births
Living people
Actresses from Córdoba, Argentina
People from Córdoba, Argentina
Argentine female models
Argentine women television presenters
21st-century Argentine actresses
21st-century Argentine women
Argentine emigrants to Mexico